Local elections were held in Cebu City on May 10, 2010 within the Philippine general election. Registered voters of the city elected candidates for the following elective local posts: mayor, vice mayor, district representative, and eight councilors at-large for each district. There are two legislative districts in the city.

Mayoralty and vice mayoralty elections

Mayor
Tomas Osmeña, the incumbent, was term-limited after serving for three consecutive terms. Vice mayor Michael Rama ran for the first time as the Mayor of Cebu City. Rama defeated 9 of his election rivals, including former Mayor Alvin Garcia, Osmeña's sister Georgia Osmeña and former Senator John Henry Osmeña.

Vice Mayor
Michael Rama, the incumbent, was term-limited after serving for three consecutive terms. Former city councilor and former PROMDI party-list representative Joy Augustus Young ran for the first time as the Vice Mayor of Cebu City and defeated 7 of his election rivals.

District representatives

1st District
Raul del Mar, the incumbent, was term-limited after serving for three consecutive terms. His daughter, Rachel Marguerite del Mar, ran for the first time as the representative of Cebu City's 1st congressional district. Del Mar defeated 7 of her rivals including Lahug Barangay Captain Mary Ann de los Santos.

2nd District
Antonio Cuenco, the incumbent, was term-limited after serving for three consecutive terms. Mayor Tomas Osmeña ran for the first time as the representative of Cebu City's 2nd legislative district. Osmeña defeated 4 of his rivals including businessman Jonathan Guardo.

City Council
Number indicates the ballot number assigned for the candidates by the Commission on Elections (COMELEC).

By ticket

Liberal Party/Bando Osmeña-Pundok Kauswagan

Nacionalista Party/Kugi Uswag Sugbu

Lakas–Kampi

Laban ng Demokratikong Pilipino

Philippine Green Republican Party

Independents

Summary

By district

1st District

 

| colspan="16" style="background:black;"|

2nd District

 

| colspan="16" style="background:black;"|

References

2010 Philippine local elections
Elections in Cebu City